The Calbayog Pan-as–Hayiban Protected Landscape, also known as the Calbayog Watershed, is a watershed and protected area located northwest of the city of Calbayog, Province of Samar in Oquendo District between Tinambacan District and San Isidro, Northern Samar in the Philippines. It is a mountainous region in the Tanaoan Ridge within the Mount Zamal Range that divides the three provinces of Samar. The protected area extends along the valley of the Hayiban River, the primary source of water for the Calbayog Water District. It consists of old growth trees and a system of rivers, waterfalls and streams capable of generating 2,279 liters per day. It also contains the Pan-as Falls and surrounding landscape which also supplies hydroelectric power to the city.
In 1998, through Proclamation No. 1158 issued by President Fidel Ramos, the watershed was reclassified as a protected landscape. It is one of four protected areas in the island of Samar.

Description
The Pan-as–Hayiban protected area is one of 39 watersheds in the main island of Samar. It encompasses several barangays in the mountainous northern interior of Oquendo District by Calbayog's border with Northern Samar province. The area is the location of all three sources of water supply for the Calbayog City Water District, namely Pan-as Falls in the barangay of Pilar, and Pasungon Falls and Himoni River in the adjacent barangay of Cabatuan. It is surrounded by open canopy and residual forests with some areas of cultivation with brushes and grasslands. Ton-oc Falls in the barangay of Barral is also located within the watershed.

References

Protected landscapes of the Philippines
Geography of Samar (province)
Calbayog
Protected areas established in 1967
1967 establishments in the Philippines